Ikhsan bin Fandi Ahmad (born 9 April 1999), more commonly known as Ikhsan Fandi or mononymously as Ikhsan, is a Singaporean professional footballer who plays as a striker or winger for Thai League 1 club BG Pathum United and the Singapore national team.

Ikhsan began his footballing career by going through the youth system at the National Football Academy (NFA), with subsequent stints and trials at various clubs before debuting as a professional at the age of 17 at local club Home United in 2016. Ikhsan would move to the Young Lions in 2017, before signing for Norwegian clubs Raufoss IL and FK Jerv respectively, netting a total of 16 goals in all competitions. In 2021, he moved back to Asia, signing for Thailand's BG Pathum United FC.

Ikhsan made his senior international debut for Singapore in 2017. He has since earned 31 caps and scored 16 international goals. He has represented his country in various international tournaments, including the AFF Championship and the AFC 2022 FIFA World Cup qualification rounds.

Early life and family
Ikhsan was born on 9 April 1999 at the Thomson Medical Centre in Novena, Singapore. Ikhsan is the second eldest son of Singaporean footballing legend Fandi Ahmad and former model Wendy Jacobs. He has four siblings, one older brother, Irfan, a club teammate who plays for BG Pathum United and two younger brothers, Ilhan, who plays for Albirex Niigata (S) and Iryan, who plays for Hougang United under-17 and the other being his sister Iman.

Growing up in a tight-knit, football-loving family, Ikhsan soon developed a passion for the sport from an early age. Ikhsan attended the Singapore Sports School at Woodlands. Ikhsan holds a diploma in sports management from the Republic Polytechnic (RP).

Club career

Youth
In March 2013, Ikhsan and older brother Irfan Fandi had an opportunity to secure their first overseas trial, with Hércules, a professional club playing in the Spanish second division. However, the pair ultimately failed to secure contracts with the club due to issues relating with visas. Irfan and Ikhsan left the club after contracts could not be secured.

Later in 2013, the pair managed to sign for Chilean side A.C. Barnechea, having secured two-year contracts with the Chilean Primera División club.

Ikhsan and Irfan then joined Chilean Primera División club Universidad Católica.

Home United
Ikhsan returned to Singapore and signed for Home United together with his brother Irfan ahead of the 2016 S.League season. He made his senior debut in a 2–2 draw against Warriors FC, coming on as a substitute for Khairul Nizam in the 85th minute. Around this time, he was often away for National Service (NS) together with his brother Irfan and so he only managed to end the season with 4 appearances and 0 goals.

Young Lions
In 2017, it was announced that Ikhsan would sign for the under-23 football team, Young Lions FC ahead of the 2017 S.League season. It was revealed on 17 March 2017 that, although Ikhsan has yet to make an appearance for his new club, his former club, Club Deportivo Universidad Católica, was interested in re-signing Ikhsan and his brother Irfan after they finish their national service obligations. 5 games into the season and with the club still pointless, Ikhsan has still to make an appearance. 

On 23 April 2017, Ikhsan made his debut for the Young Lions against Tampines Rovers. In total, Ikhsan played 10 league games for the Young Lions while serving his national service as an infantry trooper. Following the conclusion of the season, it was reported that Ikhsan, along with brother Irfan, is set for a trial with English club Leeds United in March, after the end of his national service.

Ikhsan scored his professional goal in game week 7 against Hougang United. He also assisted with another goal. He stayed on with the Young Lions for the 2018 Singapore Premier League season and scored 8 goals during his entire time at the club.

Raufoss IL
In 2019, Ikhsan travelled to Norway for trials for the clubs there. After impressing in his stint there, Ikhsan was offered a 2-year contract with the newly promoted Norwegian First Division club Raufoss IL. Ikhsan played his first match for the club in a friendly against Mjondalen IF on 12 January. He came on as a substitute in the 64th minute in the 3–1 loss. He scored his first goal for the club in a friendly match on 25 January 2019 in a 6–1 win of Elverum FC; scoring a rebound off a save from the goalkeeper to score the third goal.

Ikhsan made his league debut on 8 April 2019, against Sandefjord Fotball, replacing Anton Henningsson. He hit five goals in three starts in a period between May and June and ended his first season with Raufoss with 6 goals and 1 assist in 28 matches.

On March 1, 2020, Eliteserien club IK Start invited Ikhsan for a three-day trial followed by a training camp from March 5 to 13 in Marbella, Spain, where they were scheduled to play three friendlies. However, due to the COVID-19 pandemic, Start played only one match — a 2–0 win over fellow Norwegian side Grorud IL — and Ikhsan scored during his 75-minute outing against the newly promoted second-tier outfit. Start coach Jóhannes Harðarson was impressed with his performance and cited a possible transfer. However, with the league being delayed, The Norwegian Football Federation imposing a training ban on clubs until the end of the month and the transfer window closing on April 1, the move to the top flight club was held up. The move to the IK Start eventually failed to materialise after the club and player could not agree on salary terms and contract length.

Ikhsan scored his first goal for the club in the 2020–21 season in his fifth appearance and first start of the season when he climbed highest to glance in a cross from right-back Edvard Race in the 38th minute to give Raufoss the lead in a 3–1 win against Asane on 30 August 2020. Having played just 425 minutes over 11 matches for Raufoss in 2020, scoring once, Ikhsan was keen to move away from Raufoss.

FK Jerv
Ikhsan secured a transfer deadline day move on 5 October 2020 from Raufoss IL to fellow Norwegian side FK Jerv before the transfer window closed and signed a contract until 2022.  FK Jerv is understood to have paid Raufoss over US$50,000 with a sell-on clause for Ikhsan. Ikhsan made his debut off the bench 2 days after signing, in a league match against Hamkam. He scored his first goal for the club on his full debut in a 4–2 win against his former club Raufoss on October 10, 2020. Ikhsan made his second successive start and scored in a 2–1 win over Ullensaker/Kisa IL. He timed his run to head in a cross from the right by Ghanaian midfielder Michael Baidoo, scoring his second goal for the club in his third game and helping his new club to their fourth successive victory in the league. 

On 24 October 2020, Ikhsan notched his third and fourth goal for FK Jerv in just his fifth game, helping the club to a 4–2 win against Øygarden FK, with a 50th minute tap-in, before heading in his second from a corner in the 64th minute. On 14 December 2020, Ikhsan notched his fifth goal for the club in the final game of the 2020 1. divisjon. He came on at half-time and equalised from close range in the 90th minute against Stjørdals/Blink IL. Ikhsan has called it the "most important of his career", after the result preserved FK Jerv's place in the Norwegian second tier.

On 13 June 2021, after missing the first four games of the 2021 1. divisjon due to an injury, Ikhsan scored his first goal of the season just three minutes into his first appearance after coming on as a substitute at the 72nd minute. Ikhsan latched on to a cut-back from Willis Furtado, and finishing past Igor Spiridonov from close range, to equalise for his club against Bryne FK. He then helped to set up his club's winner, in the second minute of added time, playing a one-two with Thomas Zernichow, who later back-heeled for John Olav Norheim to make it 2–1.

On 23 June 2021, Ikhsan opened the scoring on his first start since returning from injury in a 1–1 draw against Strømmen IF after a botched interception by Magnus Tvedte, allowing Ikhsan to flick the ball and put it past Simen Kjellevold Lillevik for his second goal in three matches. The 2021 season ended in Ikhsan's club FK Jerv being promoted to the Eliteserien, after the club had won 8–7 on penalties in a promotion play-off match against SK Brann on 16 December 2021. Ikhsan congratulated his club, adding that "I feel so happy and proud of my club for securing promotion and I'm looking forward to featuring and playing well against the big boys in the Eliteserien next season."

BG Pathum United 

Around this period, however, there were rumours that various clubs especially in Asia were interested in Ikhsan, after observing his performances in Norway. Such rumours turned out to be true when on 22 December 2021, Thai League 1 champions BG Pathum United announced on their Instagram account that Ikhsan has transferred to the club during the middle of their 2021–22 season, on a two-and-a-half year contract. BG Pathum had paid FK Jerv TH฿2 million for Ikhsan's services. 

On 6 April 2022, Ikhsan secured his first hat-trick for the club after scoring 4 goals in a league game against PT Prachuap that ended 7–2. Ikhsan's 4 goal haul in 11 minutes placed him only 2nd in the fastest goal hauls of the 21st century in top flight league football ahead of Kylian Mbappé's 13 minutes against Olympique Lyonnais on 7 October 2018 during the 2018–19 Ligue 1 season, who also scored 4, and behind Robert Lewandowski's 5 goals in 9 minutes against VfL Wolfsburg on 22 September 2016 during the 2015–16 Bundesliga season.

On 24 April 2022, Ikhsan scored his first few goals in Asia's continental competition, the AFC Champions League (ACL). He recorded a brace against Filipino champions United City F.C. in the 2022 AFC Champions League's group stage, ultimately helping his club to win the game 3–1, securing BG Pathum United's place at the top of the group. With the 2 goals, Ikhsan has scored across all competitions for BG Pathum United in the 2021–2022 season.

On 6 August 2022, Ikhsan won his first silverware with BG Pathum United when he scored in the 38th minute to help BG Pathum clinch the 2022 Thailand Champions Cup with a 3–2 win. On 19 August 2022, Ikhsan, along with his brother Irfan, became the first Singaporeans to reach the AFC Champions League's quarter-finals after their club defeated Hong Kong's Kitchee SC 4–0. Ikhsan was the scorer for one of the goals, with a turbo strike from the outside of the box.

International career

Youth
Ikhsan was part of the Singapore U16 which won third placed in the 26th edition of the Lion City Cup in 2015. He scored a brace against Liverpool U15. The Singapore side were 3–0 down at half time but Ikhsan came on and scored a hat trick which resulted the game to end 3–3. Both teams went on to penalties and Singapore lost to the English team by 5–3 on penalties to clinch third.

He was called up to the Singapore national under-22 team ahead of the 2017 SEA Games and broke his duck by converting a penalty against India before hitting two scorchers from distance in a 4–1 thumping of Brunei in the AFC under-23 Championship qualifiers in July. He played all 4 of the team's games at the 2017 SEA Games, scoring one goal.

Senior

HIkhsan was called up to the national team for the friendly against Hong Kong and the 2019 Asian Cup Qualifiers against Turkmenistan on 31 August and 5 September respectively. He made his debut against Hong Kong after coming on for Khairul Amri in the 71st minute. He scored his first international goal while winning his fifth cap on 7 September 2018 in an international friendly against Mauritius. He scored his second goal in the following game, helping Singapore to a 2–0 win over Fiji in a friendly match. He notched his third goal in his eighth cap against Cambodia.

Ikhsan made his AFF Championship debut in the 2018 campaign on 9 November, with a 1–0 win over Indonesia. He scored his first competitive goals for Singapore in a 6-1 demolition of Timor-Leste in the 2018 AFF Championship, getting on the score sheet twice. He notched his eighth goal for Singapore in only his eighteenth cap when he scored in a 2–1 win over Yemen in a 2022 FIFA World Cup qualification match.

Ikhsan received a call up to the national team for a friendly against Afghanistan and the 2022 FIFA World Cup qualification matches held in Riyadh against Palestine, Uzbekistan, and Saudi Arabia along with brothers, Irfan and Ilhan. This was the first time all three brothers of were called up but due to a knee injury he sustained during pre season, Ikhsan ended up withdrawing from the national team with no further replacements.

On 25 December 2021, in the second leg of the 2020 AFF Championship semi-final match against Indonesia, Ikhsan played in goal in the 119th minute after goalkeeper Hassan Sunny was sent off. By this point, Singapore was down to eight-men. Ikhsan saved a free kick and did not concede as the match ended 4–2 after extra time.

On 26 March 2022, against Malaysia, Ikhsan played alongside his brothers Irfan and Ilhan. It was the first time that the three Fandi brothers played in the same match for the national team together. It was also the first time in international professional footballing history to have three brothers playing for the national team in the same game. Ikhsan scored a double, giving Singapore a 2–1 win in the 'Causeway Derby'. 

Ikhsan scored his first international hat-trick on 14 June 2022, helping Singapore to a 6–2 win over Myanmar in the final match of their Asian Cup third-round qualifiers. His hat-trick takes his tally to 16 goals in 31 matches for the Lions as well as earning himself the title of 18th top goal scorer in Singapore's history. He notched his 17th goal in his 32nd appearance for the Lions in a 1-1 draw against India.

Personal life
Ikhsan served his National Service (NS) obligations for the Singapore Armed Forces (SAF) from 2016 to 2018. During his stint, he had continued to play and train professional football under the SAF Sportsmen Scheme by the Ministry of Defence (MINDEF) that gives special dispensation for local athletes with flexible timetables for sports events – including representing Singapore at international competitions.

Ikhsan has stated that aside from football, he enjoys swimming and visiting the island of Sentosa. His favourite local breakfast is having two egg pratas.

Career statistics

Club

Young Lions are ineligible for qualification to AFC competitions in their respective leagues.
Raufoss are ineligible for qualification to UEFA competitions in their respective leagues.

International

International caps

International goals
Scores and results list Singapore's goal tally first.

U22/23 International caps

U23 International goals 
As of match played 8 June 2019.

U19 International caps

Honours

Club 
BG Pathum United
 Thailand Champions Cup: 2022

Intermational 
Singapore U-22
 Merlion Cup: 2019

Notes

References

External links

1999 births
Living people
Singaporean footballers
Singapore international footballers
Singaporean expatriate footballers
Singapore Sports School alumni
Universidad de Chile footballers
Singapore Premier League players
Expatriate footballers in Chile
Singaporean people of Malay descent
Singaporean people of South African descent
Association football forwards
Competitors at the 2017 Southeast Asian Games
Competitors at the 2019 Southeast Asian Games
Singapore youth international footballers
Raufoss IL players
FK Jerv players
BG Pathum United F.C. players
Norwegian First Division players
Thai League 1 players
Expatriate footballers in Norway
Singaporean expatriate sportspeople in Norway
Southeast Asian Games competitors for Singapore